Bruce Delventhal is a retired American ice hockey player, coach and administrator who led two ice hockey programs before becoming the athletic director for Plattsburgh State.

Career
Born in Englewood, New Jersey, Delventhal is a graduate of Hamilton College. earned a Masters from Princeton Seminary and became an assistant coach for the Tigers ice hockey team. In 1984 Delventhal became the head coach for RIT and led the team to its first Division III national title the same year. After finishing third in the national with a school record 31 wins the following year the Tigers declined to middling records over the proceeding two years before Delventhal left to take over at Union.

In his first three seasons with the Skating Dutchmen Delventhal got the team to produce records well above .600 and reached the NCAA tournament in 1989. In 1991 Union was accepted into ECAC Hockey and promoted their ice hockey team to Division I. As a result of playing much more talented teams the Dutchmen's record dropped to 3–21–2 in 1991–92 but by their third season in the top echelon Union produced a winning record and Delventhal was named the ECAC Coach of the Year for his efforts. The Dutchmen declined to sub-.500 records for the next two years and Delventhal left the program in 1996.

With his coaching career over Delventhal spent eight years as the North American sales manager for fishing companies Yo-Zuri and Seaguar. In 2005 he was named as the athletic director for Plattsburgh State and remained with the school until his retirement in 2016. During his time as AD he was responsible for the $2.1 million of the Stafford Ice Arena and founding the Friends of Plattsburgh State Athletics, a fundraiser for the department. At the time of his retirement Delventhal had been the Secretary/Treasurer for the AHCA since 1988 and a board member of Hockey Coaches Care, an NCO.

College head coaching record

† Lowell was a provisional member of ECAC Hockey and only played a non-conference schedule.

References

External links

Year of birth unknown
Living people
American men's ice hockey centers
Hamilton Continentals men's ice hockey players
Union Dutchmen ice hockey coaches
RIT Tigers men's ice hockey coaches
People from Englewood, New Jersey
Sportspeople from Bergen County, New Jersey
Ice hockey people from New Jersey
Year of birth missing (living people)
Ice hockey players from New Jersey
Ice hockey coaches from New Jersey